Digitivalva perlepidella is a moth of the family Acrolepiidae. It is found in Great Britain, the Netherlands, France, Germany, Switzerland, Austria, Poland, the Czech Republic, Slovakia, Hungary, Croatia, Romania and Bulgaria.

The wingspan is 10–12 mm. Adults have purplish, orange brown and white markings. They are day-flying and are on wing in May and June.

The larvae feed on Inula conyza. They mine the leaves of their host plant. The mine has the form of one or several broad corridors. These corridors radiate from the leaf base, often along the midrib, towards the leaf tip. They widen into a round blotch without any frass. The larva feed during the night and retreats to the leaf base during feeding pauses. Two larvae may be found in a single mine. Pupation takes place in a separate mine. Larvae have a pale yellow to greenish body and a pale brown head. They can be found from April to May and from July to August.

References

Acrolepiidae
Moths described in 1849
Moths of Europe